Yasmina Mesfioui (born April 9, 1976 in Khouribga) is a Moroccan sport shooter. Mesfioui represented Morocco at the 2012 Summer Olympics in London, where she competed in the women's trap. She scored a total of 61 targets in the qualifying rounds by one point behind India's Shagun Chowdhary, finishing in twenty-first place.

References

External links
NBC Olympics Profile

1976 births
Living people
Moroccan female sport shooters
Trap and double trap shooters
Olympic shooters of Morocco
Shooters at the 2012 Summer Olympics
People from Khouribga
Competitors at the 2019 African Games
African Games bronze medalists for Morocco
African Games medalists in shooting